Federal elections were held in the Federation of Rhodesia and Nyasaland on 12 November 1958. The result was a victory for the ruling United Federal Party, with Roy Welensky remaining Prime Minister.

Electoral system
The Federal Parliament had 59 seats, of which four were elected by an African electoral college in the northern territories, two were nominated by governors in the northern territories, with one seat reserved for an elected European representing African interests. The remaining 52 were directly-elected using two electoral rolls; a general roll mainly consisting of Europeans and a special roll with a more representative population mix. The general roll included 83,506 Europeans and Coloureds, 2,876 Asians and 1,055 Africans, whilst the special roll included 137 Europeans, 25 coloureds, 23 Asians and 692 Africans. Thousands of eligible Africans did not register to vote.

The general roll elected 44 seats, 24 in Southern Rhodesia, 14 in Northern Rhodesia and six in Nyasaland. Both the general and special roll voted for eight African seats, four from Southern Rhodesia and two each from Northern Rhodesia and Nyasaland.

The single European seat elected to represent African interests was elected in Southern Rhodesia by members of both rolls.

Campaign
A total of 112 candidates contested 48 constituencies, with five seats in Nyasaland having only one candidate, all of whom were elected unopposed. The main contest was between the United Federal Party led by Welensky and the Dominion Party led by Winston Field. The UFP contested all 53 seats (including the five unopposed constituencies); the DP ran in 43 constituencies, the Constitution Party led by A Scott ran in eight constituencies, and the Confederate Party led by S Gurland contested a single seat in Salisbury. The remaining twelve candidates were independents.

Results

References

Federation
Election
Elections in the Federation of Rhodesia and Nyasaland
Rhodesia and Nyasaland election
Election and referendum articles with incomplete results